Salluit Airport  is located near the community of Salluit, Quebec, Canada. There are no roads into Salluit, so the airport provides the only means for the residents to access southern Quebec.

Scheduled service is provided by Air Inuit using Twin Otter and Dash 8 aircraft several times per week.

Airlines and destinations

References

External links

Certified airports in Nord-du-Québec